Philippe Ballard (born 24 November 1960) is a French politician and former journalist. He worked as a broadcaster before becoming a reporter and television presenter for La Chaîne Info (LCI).

Ballard entered politics as a municipal councillor in Le Plessis-Trevise (1989–2008) as a member of the Union for French Democracy (UDF) before being elected to the Regional Council of Île-de-France in 2021 as a member of the National Rally (RN). In 2022, he was elected to represent the 2nd constituency of Oise in the National Assembly.

Biography

Broadcasting career
Ballard was born in 1960. He graduated with a degree in communications from the School of Advertising, Press and Public Relations (EPPREP) in Paris. He first worked as a presenter on Sud Radio in the 1980s, followed by France Info and RTL in the 1990s.

Ballard joined La Chaîne Info (LCI) in 1994 as a news reporter and presented a number of political shows. He also covered famous events such as the 2008 United States presidential election and the Wedding of Prince William and Catherine Middleton. 

He is also an official of the French Confederation of Christian Workers and campaigned against LCI's proposed closure in 2014.

Political career
From 1989 to 2008, Ballard was a municipal councilor and then deputy mayor of Le Plessis-Trevise as a member of the UDF party.

He joined the National Rally in September 2020 and stood as a candidate for the party during the 2021 French regional elections in Île-de-France. For the 2022 French legislative election Ballard contested Oise's 2nd constituency and won the seat during the second round.

References

1960 births
Living people
French broadcasters
French journalists
French television presenters
Union for French Democracy politicians
People from Champigny-sur-Marne
National Rally (France) politicians
Deputies of the 16th National Assembly of the French Fifth Republic
Members of the Regional Council of Île-de-France